Year 1487 (MCDLXXXVII) was a common year starting on Monday (link will display the full calendar) of the Julian calendar.

Events 
 January–December 
 January 29 – Richard Foxe becomes Bishop of Exeter.
 March – Sigismund, Archduke of Austria, largely on the poor advice of his counselors, declares war on Venice, and seizes silver mines in and around the Sugana Valley.
 May 24 – Lambert Simnel is crowned King "Edward VI of England" in Christ Church Cathedral, Dublin, Ireland. He claims to be Edward Plantagenet, 17th Earl of Warwick, and challenges Henry VII for the throne of England, where he lands on June 5.
 June 16 – Battle of Stoke Field: The rebellion of pretender Lambert Simnel, led by John de la Pole, Earl of Lincoln, and Francis Lovell, 1st Viscount Lovell, is crushed by troops loyal to Henry VII.
 August – Bartolomeu Dias leaves Lisbon, on his voyage to the Cape of Good Hope.
 August 13 – The Siege of Málaga (1487) ends, when the Spanish take the city.
 September 9 – Hongzhi becomes Emperor of China (Ming Dynasty).
 November 30 – Albert IV, Duke of Bavaria promulgates the Reinheitsgebot, specifying three ingredients – water, malt and hops – for the brewing of beer.

 Date unknown 
 Afonso de Paiva and Pêro da Covilhã travel overland from Lisbon, in search of the Kingdom of Prester John (Ethiopia).
 The witch-hunters' manual Malleus Maleficarum, written by Heinrich Kramer with Jacob Sprenger, is published at Speyer in the Holy Roman Empire.
 Aztec emperor Ahuitzotl dedicates the Great Temple Pyramid of Tenochtitlán, with thousands of human sacrifices.
 Italian architects work on the Moscow Kremlin.
 Leonardo da Vinci creates his Vitruvian Man drawing (approximate date).
 Stockport Grammar School is founded, in the north of England.

Births 
 February 7 – Queen Dangyeong, Korean royal consort (d. 1557)
 February 8 – Ulrich, Duke of Württemberg (d. 1550)
 February 15 – Henry of the Palatinate, bishop of Utrecht (d. 1552)
 April 10 – William I, Count of Nassau-Siegen (d. 1559)
 July 5 – Johann Gramann, German theologian (d. 1541)
 July 17 – Ismail I, Shah of Persia (d. 1524)
 August 27 – Anna of Brandenburg, Duchess of Schleswig and Holstein (d. 1514)
 September 10 – Pope Julius III (d. 1555)
 October 5 – Ludwig of Hanau-Lichtenberg, German nobleman (d. 1553)
 November 14 – John III of Pernstein, Bohemian land-owner, Governor of Moravia and Count of Kladsko (d. 1548)
 date unknown
 Amda Seyon II, Emperor of Ethiopia (d. 1494)
 Magdalena de la Cruz, Franciscan nun of Cordova (d. 1560)
 Fray Tomás de Berlanga, Bishop of Panama (d. 1551)
 Piotr Gamrat, Polish Catholic archbishop (d. 1545)
 Stanisław Kostka, Polish noble (d. 1555)
 Pedro de Mendoza, Spanish conquistador (d. 1537)
 Michael Stifel, German mathematician (d. 1567)
 Giovanni da Udine, Italian painter (d. 1564)
 Peter Vischer the Younger, German sculptor (d. 1528)

Deaths 
 March 21 – Nicholas of Flüe, Swiss hermit and saint (b. 1417)
 May 27 – Tilokaraj, king of Lan Na (b. 1409)
 June 16 – John de la Pole, 1st Earl of Lincoln (b. c. 1463)
 June 26 – John Argyropoulos, Greek philosopher
 July 16 – Charlotte, Queen of Cyprus (b. 1436)
 August 23 – Maria of Cleves, French noble (b. 1426)
 September 9 – Chenghua Emperor of China (b. 1447)
 September 14 – Mara Branković, Serbian princess (b. 1416) 
 September 30 – John Sutton, 1st Baron Dudley, Lord Lieutenant of Ireland (b. 1400)
 October 22 – Antonio Bettini, Italian religious writer (b. 1396)
 date unknown
 William FitzAlan, 16th Earl of Arundel (b. 1417)
 Tlacaelel, high priest of Tenochtitlán (b. 1398)

References